Jamo Nezzar (born December 6, 1966 in Batna, Algeria) is a retired professional bodybuilder and internationally renowned personal training expert, and founder of JamCore Training and Co-owner of MyFitTribe.com.

Life and bodybuilding career 
Jamo Nezzar was born in Batna, Algeria on December 6, 1966. At a young age, Jamo was always interested in health and sports, and eventually led to studying biology. After completing his degree in biology, Jamo entered the pre-med program at the Dergana University in Algeria, soon realizing that his passion was for bodybuilding and personal training.

With this realization and newfound direction he began a 22-year journey into professional bodybuilding. In 1987, Jamo moved to London to seriously pursue bodybuilding, until 1994 he focused on training and competition, allowing him to travel the world. During his travels Jamo also worked with others as a personal trainer.

During his bodybuilding career, more than 100 articles have been written about Jamo's training style and nutritional philosophy, and he has appeared on the covers of more than 27 fitness magazines including Musclemag, Pump, Body Fitness, Muscle and Fitness and Sports Review. In addition, Jamo has been featured in television programs both in Europe and in the United States, including BBC2, Sky Sport, American Muscle, ESPN and “Lifestyle at Muscle Beach” on the Discovery Channel.

In 2001, Jamo moved to Southern California to further his career as an International Federation of BodyBuilders professional and fitness specialist. During this time his personal training efforts and development of JamCore Training were solidified into a successful system. Jamo retired from competition in 2003 and focused on helping others lead fit, healthy lives. His dynamic personality and unique personal training system take him all over the world, working with many different people. His ability to fluently speak English, French and Arabic has been a great asset throughout his life.

Company 
After retiring from professional bodybuilding, Jamo continued working as a personal trainer, JamCore Training, a personal training system offering online fitness, health and nutrition information, and core workouts that can be downloaded to a computer and video iPods. JamCore personal training is a corporation, based in Ventura, in Southern California. It has 1,776 members in the United States.

Jamo working with Incendia Media then took JamCore Training and created a great new Health & Fitness Social Network called MyFitTribe.com. The extended capabilities, great features, friendly community and MyFitTribe Team giving great Health & Fitness information in articles, videos, pictures, blogs with all the features of a social network. A number of top athletes and fitness enthusiasts from a wide variety of disciplines such as swimming, surfing, soccer, football, water polo, volleyball and martial arts.

Competition history 
1989 - England Over all Stars of Tom 
1991 - Lightheavy British- 2nd
1994 - Heavyweight British Champion- 2nd
1995 - Heavyweight British Champion- 2nd
1996 - Heavyweight British Champion- 2nd
1996 - Over all Southeast British Champion 
1999 -  Over all Heavyweight Northeast champion  
1999 - Heavyweight British Champion- 2nd
1999 - Amateur Grand Prix Champion (Pro Card)
1999 - IFBB English grand Prix (first Pro Show)- 10th 
2000 - IFBB Ironman- 14th
2001 - IFBB Pro Toronto Canada Cup- 11th 
2001 - Night of the Champion (42 competitors)- 18th
2002 - IFBB Pro Ironman- 12th
2002 - IFBB San Francisco Pro Show- 12th 
2002 - IFBB Austrian Grand Prix-10th

References

External links
My Fit Tribe Health & Fitness Social Network
JamCore Training
Jamo Nezzar's Blog
Jamo Nezzar Photograph Gallery

1966 births
Living people
People from Batna, Algeria
American bodybuilders
English bodybuilders
American people of Algerian descent
Algerian bodybuilders